Thomas Silva from the National Institute of Standards and Technology (NIST), Boulder, CO was named Fellow of the Institute of Electrical and Electronics Engineers (IEEE) in 2016 for contributions to the understanding and applications of magnetization dynamics.

References

Fellow Members of the IEEE
Living people
Year of birth missing (living people)
Place of birth missing (living people)
American electrical engineers
Fellows of the American Physical Society